The 47th Guards Nizhnedneprovskaya Red Banner Order of Bogdan Khmelnitsky Tank Division, is a tank division of the Russian Ground Forces.

It was formed in October 1942, during World War II from the first formation of the 154th Rifle Division as the 47th Guards Rifle Division. It served with the 8th Guards Army from late 1943. In late 1945, the division was converted into the 19th Guards Mechanized Division as part of the Group of Soviet Occupation Forces in Germany. It was ultimately relocated to Hillersleben as part of the 3rd Shock Army (later the 3rd Army) and served there with the Group of Soviet Forces in Germany for the rest of the Cold War, being converted to the 26th Guards Tank Division in 1957 and renumbered to restore its original number in 1965. Disbanded in 1997, the division was reestablished in 2022.

World War II 
The 47th Guards Rifle Division was formed on 20 October 1942 by the conversion of the first formation of the 154th Rifle Division for the latter's "courage and heroism" during the Kozelsk Offensive. It included the 437th, 473rd, and 510th Rifle Regiments, the 571st Artillery Regiment, and smaller units. The commander of the 154th, Major General Yakov Fokanov, continued in command of the 47th Guards. The division's units received Guards designations on 26 December, with the rifle regiments becoming the 137th, 140th, and 142nd Guards, while the artillery regiment became the 99th Guards.

On February 13, 1944, by Order No. 28, the honorary name "Nizhnedneprovskaya"- was granted to the division by the order of the Supreme Commander-in-Chief.

Postwar 
In late May 1945, the division with the 8th Guards Army became part of the newly created Group of Soviet Occupation Forces in Germany (renamed the Group of Soviet Forces in Germany (GSFG) in 1954). In late 1945, the 47th Guards Rifle Division was converted into the 19th Guards Mechanized Division. The latter included three mechanized regiments and two tank regiments: the 62nd, 63rd, and 64th Guards Mechanized Regiments, formed from the 137th, 140th, and 142nd Guards Rifle Regiments, and the 26th and 153rd Tank Regiments, the former 244th Separate Tank Regiment and 153rd Tank Brigade, respectively.  It was subsequently transferred to the 3rd Shock Army (the 3rd Army from 1954) in 1947, joining the 79th Rifle Corps. The corps was renumbered as the 23rd in 1955 and disbanded a year later, leaving the division directly subordinated to the army headquarters. On 17 May 1957, the division was converted into the 26th Guards Tank Division. The 63rd and 64th Guards Mechanized Regiments were accordingly disbanded, while the 62nd Guards became the 245th Guards Motor Rifle Regiment. To replace the disbanded units, the 49th Guards Tank Regiment was transferred to the 26th Guards from the 12th Guards Tank Division.

The division was renumbered as the 47th Guards to restore its World War II designation on 11 January 1965. The 49th Guards was subsequently renumbered as the 197th Guards in addition. As the Cold War ended, the GSFG was reduced in size and renamed the Western Group of Forces. Following the Dissolution of the Soviet Union at the end of 1991, the division became part of the Russian Ground Forces. In April 1993, the division began its withdrawal to Mulino, Nizhny Novgorod Oblast, in the Moscow Military District.

The division was disbanded by merging it with the 31st Tank Division of the Moscow Military District into the 3rd Motor Rifle Division at Nizhny Novgorod in 1997.

21st century 
The division was reestablished from the 6th Separate Tank Brigade under the command of Colonel Yevgeny Doroshenko on 1 December 2021 as part of the 1st Guards Tank Army at Mulino. The command structure and composition of the division remain unclear. Among others, the 47th Guards include elements of the former 6th Tank Brigade, now forming the 26th Tank Regiment, the 7th Separate Reconnaissance Battalion, the 1077th Separate Material Supply Battalion, and the 63rd Separate Anti-Aircraft Missile Battalion.

The division allegedly suffered significant losses in personnel and equipment. One of the division's tank regiments (26th Tank Regiment) may have been neutralized in March 2022 near Kamyanka, Kharkiv region.

The 26th Tank Regiment took part in the 2022 Russian invasion of Ukraine on the Northeastern front around Kharkiv, and suffered substantial losses. A 1st Guards Tank Army document covering losses until 15 March, published by Ukrainian intelligence, revealed that the 26th Tank Regiment had lost four killed, 13 wounded and sixteen vehicles, and the 7th Separate Reconnaissance Battalion had lost five killed and 13 wounded. Reportedly, conscripts from the 26th Tank Regiment refused to fight in Ukraine and requested to terminate their contracts.

On April 12, 2022, Ukrainian Defence Intelligence wrote that soldiers of the 47th GTD had failed to receive promised additional payments for fighting in Ukraine and that the military leadership had ignored appeals for the money.

References

Citations

Bibliography 

 

 

Tank divisions of the Soviet Union
Tank divisions of Russia
Military units and formations established in 1965
Military units and formations disestablished in 1997
Military units and formations established in 2022